The 2016 ISCM World Music Days of the International Society for Contemporary Music were held from 29 March to 3 April 2016 in Tongyeong, South Korea. It was the second time for South Korea to host the ISCM World Music Days, following the 1997 ISCM World Music Days in Seoul. With the motto "Sounds of Tomorrow", the festival built on the spirit of world-renowned contemporary classic composer Isang Yun. Mainly organized by the Tongyeong International Music Festival, it brought together a selection of recently composed music from six continents, presented in the new Tongyeong Concert Hall that had been inaugurated in November 2013.

The opening night also featured the opera "The Beauty and the Beast" by US composer Philip Glass.

References

External links
 

2016
2016 music festivals
2016 in South Korean music
Classical music festivals in South Korea
Tongyeong
2016 festivals in Asia